Javier Alberto Frana (born 25 December 1966) is a former tennis player from Argentina and former tennis commentator for ESPN Latin America. He won 1996 French Open Mixed Doubles title with compatriot Patricia Tarabini.

Tennis career
Frana turned professional in 1986. He reached his career-high ATP singles ranking on July 24, 1995, when he became world No. 30. His highest doubles ranking was world No. 14, achieved on May 25, 1992.

Olympics
Frana debuted at the Seoul Olympics in 1988, where he was defeated in the second round by fellow countryman Martín Jaite, 2–6, 4–6 and 2–6. At the 1992 Olympics in Barcelona, he reached the second round again, this time falling to France's Fabrice Santoro, 6–4, 2–6, 1–6, and 1–6. He represented his native country for the last time in Olympic competition at the 1996 Summer Olympics in Atlanta, United States, where he was defeated in the first round by Great Britain's Greg Rusedski.

Personal life
Frana was born in Rafaela, Argentina. He is of Croat origin, his family is from the Trogir area.

ATP career finals

Singles: 9 (3 titles, 6 runner-ups)

Doubles: 16 (7 titles, 9 runner-ups)

Mixed doubles (1 win)

ATP Challenger and ITF Futures finals

Singles: 4 (1–3)

Doubles: 13 (9–4)

Performance timelines

Singles

Doubles

Mixed doubles

External links
 
 
 

1966 births
Argentine male tennis players
Argentine people of Croatian descent
Hopman Cup competitors
Living people
Olympic bronze medalists for Argentina
Olympic medalists in tennis
Olympic tennis players of Argentina
People from Rafaela
Tennis players at the 1988 Summer Olympics
Tennis players at the 1992 Summer Olympics
Tennis players at the 1995 Pan American Games
Tennis players at the 1996 Summer Olympics
Grand Slam (tennis) champions in mixed doubles
Medalists at the 1992 Summer Olympics
Pan American Games gold medalists for Argentina
Pan American Games silver medalists for Argentina
Pan American Games medalists in tennis
French Open champions
Medalists at the 1995 Pan American Games
Sportspeople from Santa Fe Province
20th-century Argentine people